The 1877 New Jersey gubernatorial election was held on November 6, 1877. Democratic nominee George B. McClellan, who was the national Democratic Nominee in 1864,  defeated Republican nominee William A. Newell with 51.65% of the vote.

General election

Candidates
Rodolphus Bingham (Prohibition)
Thomas B. Hoxey (Greenback)
George B. McClellan, former General of the U.S. Army and Democratic nominee for President in 1864 (Democratic)
William A. Newell, former Governor of New Jersey (Republican)

Results

References

1877
New Jersey
1877 New Jersey elections
November 1877 events